Bradley David Fenner Shields (born 2 April 1991) is a rugby union player for USA Perpignan in the Top 14. He played 8 times for the England national rugby union team in 2018 and 2019. In November 2017 he signed with Wasps.

Early career

Born in the town of Masterton, New Zealand, Shields attended Taita College in the suburb of Lower Hutt where he played first XV rugby and served as deputy head boy.   After finishing high school, he began playing for Petone in Wellington's local club rugby competition while also captaining  at under-20 level.

Senior career

Shields made his provincial debut aged just 19 in 2010. That was to be his only appearance during the season, however the following year, he became much more of a regular, featuring 10 times and scoring his first 2 provincial tries as the Lions finished a disappointing 6th on the Premiership log.

Shields captained the side and was named as Wellington's Player of the Year for his efforts.

The Lions failed to gain promotion to the Premiership at the first time of asking, finishing 2nd, behind  on the Championship log before being defeated by the same opposition in the playoff final, narrowly going down 26–25.   Injury restricted Shields to just 6 matches in 2015 where he scored a try and picked up a yellow card.

2016 saw Wellington once again come to close to earning promotion but yet again falling just short. Shield played 9 of 11 games during the campaign.

It was announced on 19 November 2017 that he would join Wasps in 2018. Wasps entered administration on 17 October 2022 and Shields was made redundant along with all other players and coaching staff.

A move to the French Top 14 side USA Perpignan was confirmed on 26 October 2022.

Super Rugby

With just a little over a season's experience of provincial rugby under his belt, Shields was signed to a Super Rugby contract with the  ahead of the 2012 season. Faced with stiff competition for a place in the starting line up from the likes of Jack Lam, Faifili Levave, Karl Lowe and Victor Vito, he acquitted himself well and went on to play 13 times during his debut season of Super Rugby, with 10 of these appearances coming from the replacements bench.

Shields enjoyed a breakout year in 2013, playing in all 16 of the Hurricanes games, including 13 starts and 3 tries before a knee injury hindered him in 2014, restricting him to only 6 matches.

Shields featured heavily in both campaigns, playing 18 times in 2015 and 16 times in 2016 as well as contributing 2 tries in each season.

On 27 June 2017, Shields captained the Hurricanes to a historic draw against the touring British and Irish Lions side. Shields was replaced by Reed Prinsep in the 56th minute, with the Hurricanes finishing the game at 31-31.

Shields was named as captain of the Hurricanes for the 2018 season despite his upcoming departure, with regular captain Dane Coles ruled out for the season with a torn ACL.

International

Shields was a New Zealand Under-17 representative in 2008 before being a member of the New Zealand Under-20 side which won the 2011 IRB Junior World Championship in Italy, scoring 1 try in 5 matches at the tournament. He had been named in All Blacks training squads in 2012 and 2016, but did not go on to make his senior international debut.

On 5 November 2016, Shields featured for the Barbarians in their 31–31 draw against  at Wembley Stadium.   He played the entire 80 minutes in the number 6 jersey in a side containing his Hurricanes teammates, Reggie Goodes and Michael Fatialofa.

On 9 June 2018, he made his debut for England, coming on as a replacement in England's narrow defeat against South Africa at Ellis Park.  He was then named as a starter for the second test against South Africa the following week.

Shields started once in the 2019 Six Nations Championship against  and featured twice more from the bench. Shields missed selection for the 2019 Rugby World Cup, having been ruled out of contention for the competition through injury. Uncapped player, Lewis Ludlam, was called in as a replacement for Shields during warmup fixtures.  He has not featured in an international since.

International tries

Career honours

New Zealand Under-20

IRB Junior World Championship - 2011

Hurricanes

Super Rugby - 2016

Super Rugby statistics

References

Living people
New Zealand rugby union players
Hurricanes (rugby union) players
Wellington rugby union players
1991 births
Rugby union flankers
Barbarian F.C. players
People from Masterton
New Zealand people of English descent
England international rugby union players
Expatriate sportspeople in England